The lionhead cichlid (Steatocranus casuarius), also known as African blockhead, buffalohead, humphead cichlid, lionhead or lumphead is a species of rheophilic cichlid native to Pool Malebo and the Congo River.  It uses caves for spawning.  This species can reach a length of  TL.  This species can also be found in the aquarium trade.

References

Lionhead cichlid
Taxa named by Max Poll
Fish described in 1939
Endemic fauna of the Democratic Republic of the Congo